The Divisiones Regionales de Fútbol in the Community of Extremadura:
Primera División Extremeña (Level 6 of the Spanish football pyramid)
Segunda División Extremeña (Level 7)

League chronology
Timeline

Primera Extremeña

The Primera Extremeña is the sixth level of competition of the Spanish league football in the Autonomous Community of Extremadura. It is organized by Football Federation of Extremadura.

League system
The Regional Preferente consists of three groups of sixteen clubs each one. Top four teams at final standings play the promotion playoffs. Bottom four teams are relegated.

2022–23 teams

Group 1
Amanecer
Cdad. Plasencia
Casar
Cacereño B
Chinato
Jaraíz
Malpartida
Moraleja
Moralo CP B
Puente San Fco.
Talayuela
Valdefuentes
CRC

Group 2
AD Lobón
Alburquerque
CD Badajoz B
CD Guadiana
CD Gévora
CF San Jorge
CP Cheles
CP Valverdeño
EF Puebla
Sanvicenteño
UD Talavera
Valdelacalzada

Group 3
Cabeza del Buey
CD Castuera
CD Ilipense
CD Monterrubio
CD Quintana
CF Campanario
CP Guareña
Gimnástico Don B.
Hernán Cortés
Santa Amalia
Valdehornillos
R. Mérida City

Group 4
AD Mérida B
CD San Serván
CD Usagre
CP Monesterio
CP Oliva
EMD Aceuchal
EMD Solana
Gran Maestre
Higuera CF
Santa Marta
SC Garrovilla
CD Zafra

Champions

Segunda Extremeña

The Segunda Extremeña is the seventh level of competition of the Spanish league football in the Autonomous Community of Extremadura. It is organized by Football Federation of Extremadura.

League system
The Primera Regional is played with four groups of 14 teams. At the end of the season, the champion of each group are promoted to the Regional Preferente. The two winners of the runners-up playoff are also promoted. The Primera Regional de Extremadura is the lowest league in the Spanish league pyramid in Extremadura, so no clubs are relegated.

2022–23 teams

Group 1
CD Coria B
CD Tietar
CF Jerte
CF Piornal
CF Verato
CP Brocense
CP Cabezuela
CP Torreorgaz
Las Hurdes CF
Norte Extrem.
Torrejoncillo
UD Aceituna

Group 2
AD Hispanolusa
AD Obandina
CD Albuera
CD Alconchel
CD La Roca
CP Don Bosco
Peña El Valle
Santa Isabel
S.Fco. Olivenza
Vnva. del Fresno
Villar del Rey Ind.
Valdebotoa

Group 3
 Alan. Alange
 Atl. Torremejía
 CD Almoharín
 CD Metelinense
 CD Zarceño
 Don Álvaro B
 Eme. Augusta
 Madr. Olimpia
 Sta. Quiteria
 Trujillanos CF
 Talleres Anglo
 UP Barbaño

Group 4
 AD Siruela
 AD Zurbarán
 Athletic Valle
 CD La Haba
 CD Talarrubias
 CD Torviscal
 Esparragosa
 Fuenlab. Montes
 Olympic Peleño
 Orellana Costa D.
 San Bartolomé
SP Herrera
Sp. Malpartida

Group 5
 Ath. Fregenal
 CD Berlanga
 Corte de Peleas
 CD Extremadura
 CP Belenense
 EMD Aceuchal B
 Hernando de Soto
 SP Ribereña
 SP Villafranca B
 UD Bienvenida
 UD Fornacense
 UP Segureña

External links
Futbolme.com
Federación Extremeña de Fútbol

Divisiones Regionales de Fútbol
Football in Extremadura